Roßdorf may refer to the following places in Germany:

Roßdorf, a municipality in the district Darmstadt-Dieburg, Hesse
Roßdorf, Saxony-Anhalt, a municipality in the district Jerichower Land, Saxony-Anhalt
Roßdorf, Thuringia, a municipality in the district Schmalkalden-Meiningen, Thuringia